Du Xuean (born 3 July 1956) is a Chinese sports shooter. He competed in the men's 25 metre rapid fire pistol event at the 1984 Summer Olympics.

References

1956 births
Living people
Chinese male sport shooters
Olympic shooters of China
Shooters at the 1984 Summer Olympics
Place of birth missing (living people)
Shooters at the 1982 Asian Games
Asian Games medalists in shooting
Asian Games gold medalists for China
Asian Games silver medalists for China
Medalists at the 1982 Asian Games
20th-century Chinese people